Orange High School is a historic school located in Orange, Virginia.  The first school building at the site was built in 1911 based on a design by noted Virginia architect Charles M. Robinson.  The original structure is a -story building with a monumental Doric portico  modeled on the Temple of Albano.  In 1925, a one-story annex was added to the school. The school opened in 1911 as an elementary, middle, and high school.  It continued in operation until 1970.  When plans to demolish the original 1911 building were announced in the late 1990s, local residents protested.  The property was converted for use as apartments for senior citizens.

The building was listed on the National Register of Historic Places in 2001.

References

External links

National Register of Historic Places in Orange County, Virginia
Neoclassical architecture in Virginia
School buildings completed in 1911
Schools in Orange County, Virginia
School buildings on the National Register of Historic Places in Virginia
Defunct schools in Virginia
1911 establishments in Virginia